In theoretical computer science and coding theory, the long code is an error-correcting code that is locally decodable. Long codes have an extremely poor rate, but play a fundamental role in the theory of hardness of approximation.

Definition
Then the long code encoding of a message  is the string  where  denotes concatenation of strings.
This string has length .

The Walsh-Hadamard code is a subcode of the long code, and can be obtained by only using functions  that are linear functions when interpreted as functions  on the finite field with two elements.

An equivalent definition of the long code is as follows:
Thus, the Long code encodes a -bit string as a -bit string.

Properties
Among all codes that do not contain repetitions, the long code has the longest possible output.
Moreover, it contains all non-repeating codes as a subcode.

References

Coding theory
Error detection and correction